Survival Knife was an American post-hardcore band, which formed in early 2011. They played their first show in March 2012. The band has played shows through the Pacific Northwest with such groups as METZ, Bitch Magnet, Mosquito Hawk, Wimps, Kinski, and Hungry Ghost. They completed a west coast tour in April 2013 supporting Modest Mouse.  Two members of Survival Knife, Justin Trosper and Brandt Sandeno, were members of the post-hardcore band Unwound that broke up in 2002.

They released their first single, "Traces of Me" on March 5, 2013 on the US label Sub Pop.

They released their debut album, Loose Power on April 30, 2014 on the US label Glacial Pace.

Discography

References

External links
Survival Knife on Subpop.com
Survival Knife on Glacialpace.com

Sub Pop artists
Musical groups from Washington (state)
Musical groups from Olympia, Washington
Musical groups established in 2012
American post-hardcore musical groups
2012 establishments in Washington (state)